Jakub Kolář (born June 15, 1992) is a Czech former professional ice hockey defenceman. He played seven games with HC Sparta Praha in the Czech Extraliga during the 2010–11 Czech Extraliga season.

References

External links

1992 births
Living people
Czech ice hockey defencemen
IHC Písek players
HC Kobra Praha players
HC Sparta Praha players
HC Stadion Litoměřice players